Persatuan Sepakbola Pekanbaru dan Sekitarnya (commonly known as PSPS) is an Indonesian football team based in Pekanbaru, Riau. They currently play in Liga 2. They play at the Riau Main Stadium.

Players

Current squad

Coaching staff

Achievements and honors
Liga Indonesia First Division
Winners (1): 1999

Kit supplier
 Lotto (2009–2011)
 Pluso (2012)
 Joma (2012–2014)
 Calcetto (2015–2017)
 Classico (2017–2018)
 Kelme (2018–2019)
 Curva (2019–2021)
93 Sports (2021–present)

References

External links

  Facebook fanspage PSPS PEKANBARU
  Facebook PSPS

Pekanbaru
Football clubs in Indonesia
Football clubs in Riau
Association football clubs established in 1955
Sport in Riau
1955 establishments in Indonesia